Stewart is a district municipality at the head of the Portland Canal in northwestern British Columbia, Canada, near the Alaskan panhandle. In 2011, its population was about 494.

History
The Nisga'a, who live around the Nass River, called the head of Portland Canal , meaning "safe house" or "strong house", probably because it served them as a retreat from the harassment of the Haida and Tlingit from the outer coast. They travelled in the area seasonally to pick berries and hunt birds.

The Portland Canal was first explored and named in July 1793 by Captain George Vancouver in honour of William Cavendish-Bentinck, 3rd Duke of Portland (1738–1808), Home Secretary from 1794 to 1801. Vancouver met two friendly native people at the current site of Stewart. The area around the Portland Canal was again explored in 1896 by Captain D.D. Gaillard of the United States Army Corps of Engineers (after whom the Gaillard Cut in the Panama Canal was later named). Two years after Gaillard's visit, the first prospectors and settlers arrived. Among them was D. J. Raine, for whom a creek and a mountain in the area are named. The Stewart brothers arrived in 1902. In 1905, Robert M. Stewart, the first postmaster, named the town Stewart.

Gold and silver mining dominated the early economy. Nearby Hyder, Alaska, boomed with the discovery of rich silver veins in the upper Salmon River basin in 1917 and 1918. Hyder became an access and supply point for the mines, while Stewart served as the port for Canadian mining activity, which was centred on the town of Premier, which was accessed by a  road from Hyder.
Other mines in the area were the Jumbo, BC Silver, Red Cliff, and Porter-Idaho. More large camps were south of Stewart at Anyox and Maple Bay.

Disney's Eight Below, starring Paul Walker and Jason Biggs, was partially filmed here.  The exterior shots from John Carpenter's science fiction classic The Thing were filmed within Salmon Glacier.

Demographics 

Transportation
Stewart is accessible by highway from the British Columbia highway system, via Highway 37A, by boat through the Portland Canal, or by air through Stewart Airport.

Location

West of Stewart is Hyder, Alaska, which is only  from the town. Northwest of Stewart, and accessible only by way of Hyder, is Premier, British Columbia, notable for being in Canada, but only accessible through a portion of the United States that is only accessible from Canada.

It is the northernmost point on Canada's Pacific coast.

Climate
Stewart is Canada's most northerly ice-free port. Due to its proximity to the ocean, the climate retains strong maritime influences, with winters being far milder than locations farther inland. With an average of 985 hours of annual sunshine, Stewart is one of the cloudiest places in the world.

See also
Alaska boundary dispute
Granduc Mine
Hyder, Alaska

References

External links

District municipalities in British Columbia
Ghost towns in British Columbia
Populated places in the Regional District of Kitimat–Stikine
Stewart Country